Westwood Town Center Historic District is a registered historic district in Cincinnati, Ohio, listed in the National Register of Historic Places on December 2, 1974.  It contains 5 contributing buildings.

Notes

External links
Documentation from the University of Cincinnati

Historic districts in Cincinnati
National Register of Historic Places in Cincinnati
Samuel Hannaford buildings
Historic districts on the National Register of Historic Places in Ohio
Westwood, Cincinnati